Sol Myron Linowitz (December 7, 1913 – March 18, 2005) was an American diplomat, lawyer, and businessman.

Early life
Linowitz was born to a Jewish family in Trenton, New Jersey. He was a graduate of Trenton Central High School, Hamilton College class of 1935 and Cornell Law School class of 1938, where he served as a trustee.

Career
In the 1960s, Linowitz served as the chair of the Xerox Corporation.

Linowitz helped negotiate the return of the Panama Canal to Panama under the direction of President Jimmy Carter.  In 1964, Linowitz joined David Rockefeller to launch the International Executive Service Corps, which was established to help bring about prosperity and stability in developing nations through the growth of private enterprise. Besides being a career diplomat, lawyer, and one time chairman of Xerox, he wrote two books, The Making of a Public Man: A Memoir, and The Betrayed Profession.

From 1974 to 1978, Linowitz was head of the Federal City Council, a group of business, civic, education, and other leaders interested in economic development in Washington, D.C.

On November 6, 1979, the Carter administration announced Linowitz would replace Robert S. Strauss as Special Representative for Middle East Peace Negotiations (the Palestinian autonomy talks). On December 4, the Senate Foreign Relations Committee approved his appointment.

In 1983, he received the Golden Plate Award of the American Academy of Achievement.

He was awarded the Presidential Medal of Freedom in 1998 by President Bill Clinton.

References

External links

1913 births
2005 deaths
Writers from Trenton, New Jersey
Hamilton College (New York) alumni
Cornell Law School alumni
20th-century American lawyers
20th-century American memoirists
20th-century American Jews
Presidential Medal of Freedom recipients
Directors of Xerox
Permanent Representatives of the United States to the Organization of American States
Trenton Central High School alumni
21st-century American Jews